The Bayer designation f Orionis is shared by two star systems in the constellation Orion:
f1 Orionis (69 Orionis)
f2 Orionis (72 Orionis)

Orionis, f
Orion (constellation)